Sveti Juraj (Saint George in Croatian) can refer to several places:

Sveti Juraj, village in Lika-Senj County in Croatia
Sveti Juraj na Bregu, municipality in Međimurje County in Croatia
Sveti Juraj u Trnju, village in Međimurje County in Croatia

It may also refer to:
Sveti Đorđe, an island in the Bay of Kotor in Montenegro, also referred to as Sveti Juraj

See also
 Sveti Jure, the highest peak of Biokovo